The 1975 Beirut bus massacre, also known as the Ain el-Rammaneh incident and the "Black Sunday", was the collective name given to a short series of armed clashes involving Phalangist and Palestinian elements in the streets of central Beirut, which is commonly presented as the spark that set off the Lebanese Civil War in the mid-1970s.

Background

Early in the morning of April 13, 1975, outside the Church of Notre Dame de la Delivrance at the predominantly Maronite inhabited district of Ain el-Rammaneh in East Beirut, an altercation occurred between half a dozen armed Palestine Liberation Organization (PLO) guerrillas (Arabic: Fedaiyyin) on a passing vehicle performing the costumary wavering and firing their automatic rifles into the air (Arabic: Baroud) and a squad of uniformed militiamen belonging to the Phalangist Party's Kataeb Regulatory Forces (KRF) militia, who were diverting the traffic at the front of the newly consecrated church where a family baptism was taking place. As the rowdy Palestinians refused to be diverted from their route, the nervous Phalangists tried to halt their progress by force and a scuffle quickly ensued, which resulted in the death of the PLO driver of the vehicle after being accidentally shot.

This would have been just another stupid and tragic incident among many of the kind, if had not been followed by a dramatic event that took place an hour or so later at that same Church. At 10:30 am when the congregation was concentrated outside the front door of the church upon the conclusion of the ceremony, a gang of unidentified gunmen approached in two civilian cars – oddly enough, rigged with posters and bumper stickers belonging to the Popular Front for the Liberation of Palestine (PFLP), a PLO faction – and suddenly opened fire on the church and at VIPs present, killing four people.
  
Among the dead caused by the drive-by shooting were Joseph Abu Assi, an off-duty Phalange militant and father of the baptised child, plus three bodyguards – Antoine Husseini, Dib Assaf and Selman Ibrahim Abou, shot while attempting to return fire on the assailants. – of the personal entourage of the Maronite za'im (political boss) Pierre Gemayel, the powerful leader of the right-wing Phalangist Party, who managed nevertheless to escape unscathed.  The attackers fled the scene under fire by the surviving bodyguards and KRF militiamen on duty at the time.

Bus attack
In the commotion that followed, armed Phalangist KRF and NLP Tigers militiamen took the streets, and began to set up roadblocks at Ain el-Rammaneh and other Christian-populated eastern districts of the Lebanese Capital, stopping vehicles and checked identities, while in the mainly Muslim western sectors the Palestinian factions did likewise.

Believing that the perpetrators were Palestinian guerrillas who carried the attack in retaliation for the earlier driver incident, and outraged by the audacity of the attempt on the life of their historical leader, the Phalangists planned an immediate response. 
Shortly after mid-day, a PLO bus carrying unsuspecting Palestinian Arab Liberation Front (ALF) militants and Lebanese sympathizers (including women and children) returning from a political rally at Tel el-Zaatar held by the Popular Front for the Liberation of Palestine – General Command (PFLP-GC) passed through Ain el-Rammaneh on its way to Sabra refugee camp.  As the bus drove through the narrow street-alleys, it fell into an ambush outside the same Church perpetrated by a squad of Phalange KRF militiamen led by Bashir Gemayel, Pierre Gemayel's younger son. The Phalangists promptly fired upon the vehicle, killing 27 and wounding 19 of its passagers, including the driver. According to sociologist Samir Khalaf all 28 passengers were killed, although other sources stated that 22 PLO members were shot dead by the Phalangists.

Consequences
The Church Massacre that preceded the bloody incident known as the "Bus Massacre," incited long-standing sectarian hatred and mistrust. It sparked heavy fighting throughout the country between Kataeb Regulatory Forces militiamen and the Palestinian Fedaiyyin and their leftist allies of the Lebanese National Movement (LNM) alliance, resulting in over 300 dead in just three days.

The recently appointed Lebanese prime-minister, the Sunni Muslim Rashid al-Sulh, tried vainly to defuse the situation as quickly as possible by sending in the evening of the day following the massacre a Gendarmerie detachment from the Lebanese Internal Security Forces (ISF) to Ain el-Rammaneh, which detained a number of suspects. In addition, Prime-Minister Sulh tried to pressure Phalangist Party' President Pierre Gemayel to hand over to the authorities the Phalangist KRF militiamen responsible for the death of the Palestinian driver. Gemayel publicly refused however, hinting that he and his Party would no longer abide by the authority of the government. He later sent a Phalangist delegation on a mission to secure the release of the previously detained suspects held in custody by the Lebanese authorities, stating that the individuals involved in the incident were just defending themselves and that no charges could be pressed against them.

As news of the murders spread, armed clashes between PLO guerrilla factions and other Christian militias erupted throughout the Lebanese Capital.  Soon Lebanese National Movement (LNM) militias entered the fray alongside the Palestinians.  Numerous ceasefires and political talks held through international mediation proved fruitless. Sporadic violence escalated into a full-fledged civil war over the next two years, known as the 1975–77 phase of the Lebanese Civil War, in which 60,000 people lost their lives and split Lebanon along factional and sectarian lines for another 15 years.

Controversy

The chain of events that led to the Ain el-Rammaneh church shooting and the subsequent "Bus massacre" (or "Black Sunday") of April 1975 have been the subject of intense speculation and heated debate in Lebanon since the end of the Civil War in 1990.  There are two conflicting versions of what happened that day, with the Phalangists describing it as an act of self-defense by insisting that the bus carried armed ALF guerrilla reinforcements firing weapons.  The Phalangists anticipated such a reaction by guarding the church, and in the ensuing shoot-out they claimed to have killed 14 Palestinian Fedaiyyin.

Although most PLO accounts refute this version of the events by describing the bus passengers as civilian families' victims of an unprovoked attack and not fully armed guerrillas, Abd al-Rahim Ahmad of the ALF did confirm years later that some of them were off-duty members of that faction.  Another high-ranking PLO official, Abu Iyad, later suggested that the incident was not the responsibility of the Phalange, but rather a deliberate provocation engineered by the National Liberal Party (NLP), a predominantly Christian conservative Party led by former President Camille Chamoun. Other Palestinian leaders suspected instead that the provocateurs were the Phalangists.

However, none of these versions was ever substantiated by plausible evidence, and many began to doubt that the Palestinian PFLP was really responsible the earlier Church attack.  Indeed, critics pointed to the all-too-obvious presence of civilian automobiles plastered with propaganda of that PLO faction and the tactic employed (a drive-by shooting), which did not fit well into the methods commonly used by the Palestinian guerrilla movements at the time.

Therefore the true identity of the moral authors behind it – and particularly that of their faction or Party – remained shrouded in mystery until the late 1990s.  New evidence that then came to light seems to confirm that they were not Palestinian feday’ but actually members of the Syrian Social National Party or SSNP, a rival Lebanese multi-confessional, pan-Syrian right-wing organization. The SSNP carried out the action in retaliation for the brutal clamp-down on their militants following their abortive coup attempt in the turn of 1961-62, orchestrated by the then Interior Minister Pierre Gemayel. As for the SSNP gunmen involved in the April 1975 drive-by shooting, they were never apprehended and apparently disappeared without a trace. Some unconfirmed reports suggest that they were later killed in action.

The bus was later found and exhibited in mid-2011.

See also
Bashir Gemayel
Pierre Gemayel
Lebanese Front
Lebanese Civil War
Lebanese National Movement
Tigers Militia
Syrian Social Nationalist Party in Lebanon
National Liberal Party
Kataeb Party
Kataeb Regulatory Forces

References

Bibliography

 Abu Iyad (Salah Khalaf, with Eric Rouleau), My Home, My Land: A Narrative of the Palestinian Struggle, Times Books, New York 1981. 
Adel Beshara, The Politics of Frustration - The Failed Coup of 1961, Routledge 2013.  –  
 David Hirst, Beware of small states: Lebanon, battleground of the Middle East, Nation Books, 2011. , 1568586574
 Denise Ammoun, Histoire du Liban contemporain: Tome 2 1943–1990, Éditions Fayard, Paris 2005.  (in French) – 
 Edgar O'Ballance, Civil War in Lebanon, 1975–92, Palgrave Macmillan, London 1998. 
 Farid El-Kazen, The Breakdown of the State in Lebanon 1967-1976, I.B. Tauris, London 2000.  –  
 Jean Sarkis, Histoire de la guerre du Liban, Presses Universitaires de France – PUF, Paris 1993.  (in French)
 John Laffin, The War of Desperation: Lebanon 1982-85, Osprey Publishing Ltd, London 1985. 
 Matthew S. Gordon, The Gemayels (World Leaders Past & Present), Chelsea House Publishers, 1988. 
 Naomi Joy Weinberger, Syrian Intervention in Lebanon: The 1975–76 Civil War, Oxford University Press, Oxford 1986. , 0195040104 
 Rex Brynen, Sanctuary and Survival: the PLO in Lebanon, Boulder: Westview Press, Oxford 1990.  – 
Robert Fisk, Pity the Nation: Lebanon at War, London: Oxford University Press, (3rd ed. 2001).  – 
 Paul Jureidini, R. D. McLaurin, and James Price, Military operations in selected Lebanese built-up areas, 1975-1978, Aberdeen, MD: U.S. Army Human Engineering Laboratory, Aberdeen Proving Ground, Technical Memorandum 11-79, June 1979.
 Samuel M. Katz, Lee E. Russel & Ron Volstad, Armies in Lebanon 1982–84, Men-at-Arms series 165, Osprey Publishing Ltd, London 1985. 
Samir Kassir, La Guerre du Liban: De la dissension nationale au conflit régional, Éditions Karthala/CERMOC, Paris 1994.  (in French)
 Samir Khalaf, Civil and Uncivil Violence in Lebanon: A History of the Internationalization of Human Contact, Columbia University Press, New York 2002. , 0231124767
Thomas Collelo (ed.), Lebanon: a country study, Library of Congress, Federal Research Division, Headquarters, Department of the Army (DA Pam 550-24), Washington D.C., December 1987 (Third edition 1989). –  
 William W. Harris, Faces of Lebanon: Sects, Wars, and Global Extensions, Princeton Series on the Middle East, Markus Wiener Publishers, Princeton 1997. , 1-55876-115-2

External links
Chamussy (René) – Chronique d'une guerre: Le Liban 1975-1977 – éd. Desclée – 1978 (in French)
Histoire militaire de l'armée libanaise de 1975 à 1990 (in French)

Massacres of the Lebanese Civil War
Mass murder in 1975
1975 in Lebanon
Massacres in 1975
April 1975 events in Asia
History of Beirut
1975 murders in Lebanon
Road incidents in Lebanon